The Tensas Parish School Board is an entity responsible for the operation of public schools in Tensas Parish in northeastern Louisiana, United States. It is headquartered in the town of St. Joseph. The current superintendent is Paul E. Nelson, the former superintendent in neighboring Concordia Parish.

Carol Shipp Johnson, who resigned as superintendent in 2016, is the wife of a former Tensas Parish superintendent, Lanny Johnson, the current superintendent in neighboring Franklin Parish. Lanny Johnson was also a state representative for Tensas and Franklin parishes between 1976 and 1980.

Other former Tensas Parish superintendents were  Thomas M. Wade, A.E. Swanson, Stathum Crosby (1910-1977), Charles Edgar Thompson (1932-1993), and William Edward "Bill" Vosburg Sr. (born 1940). A native of Waterproof, Thompson later accepted the position of deputy superintendent for special education in Baton Rouge under state Education Superintendent J. Kelly Nix.

School board members from the early years included George Henry Clinton, John Newell, J. H. Netterville, and Thomas M. Wade. Newell had worked particularly in the establishment of the since defunct Newellton High School.

In 2006, the Tensas board closed the former Newellton High School in Newellton in northern Tensas Parish. High school students from Newellton are bused to St. Joseph to attend Tensas High School, formerly known as Joseph Moore Davidson High School, named for a heroic soldier killed in France during World War I and a son of Mayor William Mackenzie Davidson of St. Joseph. The former Waterproof High School building, long vacant, is listed on the National Register of Historic Places. It is considered historically significant for the period from 1925 to 1949, but it was used into the 1970s.

Tensas superintendent Carol Johnson struggled to improve pupil standardized test scores. For the 2012-13 school year, only 21 percent of pupils in Tensas Parish public schools ranked as proficient in the subjects of Algebra I and English II on the end-of-course examinations. That number, however, is an improvement from the 15 percent level in the preceding year, 2011-2012. Tensas Parish ranks last in the sixty-four parishes in pupil performance. Johnson said that she took steps to address the problem and replaced the principal of Tensas High School after the 2011-2012 scores became known.

In July 2018, it was revealed that Huffman & Soignier, a Monroe-based CPA firm, found that the business office of the Tensas Parish School Board has operated for nearly two years without adequate training of the staff. Hence, the oversight of taxpayer dollars and federal funding was declared deficient. The auditors said that the problems may have been preventable had the board authorized additional staff training. In 2016, the accounts payable clerk was promoted as business manager with little time to train under the departing manager. Moreover, office employees were reassigned again without adequate training. The district also got a new superintendent, as Paul Nelson succeeded the retiring Carol Johnson. The auditors urged that the district work with the CPA firm to improve procedures to ensure smooth employee turnover.

Schools

Grades 7-12
Tensas High School  (St. Joseph)
Grades PK-8
Newellton Elementary School (Newellton)Grades PK-6Tensas Elementary School (St. Joseph)

DemographicsTotal Students (as of October 1, 2007): 768GenderMale: 54%
Female: 46%Race/EthnicityAfrican American: 91.54%
White: 6.64%
Hispanic: 1.82%Socio-Economic Indicators'''
At-Risk: 90.10%
Free Lunch: 84.77%
Reduced Lunch: 5.34%

See also
List of school districts in Louisiana

References

External links
Tensas Parish School Board - Official site.

School districts in Louisiana
Education in Tensas Parish, Louisiana